Pouldergat is a commune in the Finistère department of Brittany in north-western France.

International relations
Pouldergat is twinned with the village of Glanamman, in Wales.

Population
Inhabitants of Pouldergat are called in French Pouldergatois.

Breton language
The municipality launched a linguistic plan through Ya d'ar brezhoneg on October 31, 2005.

See also
Communes of the Finistère department

References

External links

Official website 

Mayors of Finistère Association 

Communes of Finistère